Gephyrotoxin is a naturally occurring product that stems from the  Colombian tropical frog Dendrobates histrionicus. It is a member of the class of compounds known as histrionicotoxins.  This alkaloid skin secretion was first isolated from the tropical frog in 1977 by Daly and his fellow workers.

Biological uses

This compound is a relatively non-toxic chemical. At first it showed activity as a slight muscarinic antagonist, but with recent studies it has showed other interesting neurological activities. Due to these new activities, many laboratories want  to conduct future research on it. Due to this demand and the scarcity and lack of abundance of the tree frog the synthesis of this product is of much interest.

Synthesis 
The first total synthesis of gephyrotoxin was performed by Kishi and his co-workers, here they prepped an intermediate from L-pyroglutamic acid in 18 steps. Others have made it to the same intermediate in fewer steps but have included poorly diastereoselective steps. In 2008 Santarem and colleges reported total synthesis of Gephyrotoxin by obtaining an enantiopure cis-2,5-disubstituted pyrrolidine. Unlike others that included a poorly diastereoselective step, this process allowed for the development of two stereogenic centers at the same time.

References 

Quinoline alkaloids
Alkyne derivatives
Alkene derivatives
Primary alcohols